The Auberge of the Flowering Hearth is a non-fiction food book by Roy Andries De Groot

Published in 1973, the book is about the time de Groot spent at an inn called L'Auberge de l'Atre Fleuri in St-Pierre-de-Chartreuse in the Savoy region of France, and about the good meals he ate there. 

The book addresses the logic of constructing a meal of several dishes so that they harmonize with one another, to the use of primarily local and seasonal ingredients to contribute to this harmony, and also an internal harmony within individual dishes. It is also a snapshot of old-school aperitifs, such as kir, and illustrates how a modest kitchen can produce out world-class food. 

One of the more interesting aspects of the book is that de Groot was blind.

References 

1973 non-fiction books
American non-fiction books